Miniloft is a Berlin-based apartment hotel that features 14 spacious, loft-type apartments in two adjacent buildings.

Slender 
The older of the 2 buildings was renovated in 2002 and won the Berliner Architekturpreis in 2003. It contains three Classic and three Compact minilofts, as well as the owner's apartment.

Bender 
The newer building was built in 2004. It features a curved stainless steel and glass façade. In 2004, it won the EU's Mies van der Rohe award and was exhibited in the German Pavilion of the Venice Biennale. It contains four Introverted and four Extroverted minilofts.

Architecture 
Both buildings were designed by the architecture office Deadline. The twin project was published in multiple architectural journals, including A10 and the Deutsche Bauzeitung.

References

Hotels in Berlin